Mitchell 1 is an American company that produces software for automobile repair shops. Founded in 1918, the company started as a private book publisher, Service Engineering Company. It provided the first specifications and diagrams of vehicle electrical systems for automotive technicians and the general public. The company is headquartered in Poway, California, and its ownership is currently held by Snap-on Tools, Inc. (85%) and NAPA (15%).

Mitchell 1 and the National Institute for Automotive Service Excellence are sponsors of the ASE Technician of the Year award. In August 2009, the North American Council of Automotive Teachers (NACAT) recognized Mitchell 1 with the 2009 Friends of NACAT Award, given to "an industry partner that has gone above and beyond the call to support NACAT".

References 

Publishing companies established in 1918
Companies based in San Diego County, California
Software companies based in California
1918 establishments in California
Software companies of the United States